Milov is a Russian masculine surname originating from the Slavic root "mil-", meaning "dear", "cute"; its feminine counterpart is Milova. It may refer to the following notable people:

Alexander Milov (born 1979), Ukrainian artist and sculptor
Alika Milova (born 2002), Estonian singer 
Kiril Milov (born 1997), Bulgarian Greco-Roman wrestler.
Ksenia Milova (born 1992), Russian handball player
Leonid Milov (1929–2007) Russian historian
Vadim Milov (born 1972), Swiss grandmaster of chess
Valeria Milova (born 1988), Estonian dancer and choreographer
Vladimir Milov (born 1972), Russian politician
The Russian name for Mylove, a village in Ukraine

References

Russian-language surnames